Afrolittorina knysnaensis, common name the southern periwinkle, is a species of sea snail, a marine gastropod mollusk in the family Littorinidae, the winkles or periwinkles.

Description 
The size of the shell varies between 9 mm and 15 mm. Its color varies from brown with a pattern of dots with a dark ring around its every whorl, to pure black. The smooth shell has a conical shape with a short spire. The aperture is subcircular and has a transparent, horny operculum.

Distribution 
This marine species occurs off Namibia to Southern KwaZuluNatal; in the Indian Ocean off Réunion.

References 

 Paul Bartsch (1915),  Report on the Turton Collection of South African Marine Mollusks, with Additional Notes on other South African Shells Contained in the United States National Museum; Smithsonian Institution, United States National Museum, bulletin 91.
 Kilburn, R.N. & Rippey, E. (1982) Sea Shells of Southern Africa. Macmillan South Africa, Johannesburg, xi + 249 pp. page(s): 50
 Steyn, D.G. & Lussi, M. (1998) Marine Shells of South Africa. An Illustrated Collector’s Guide to Beached Shells. Ekogilde Publishers, Hartebeespoort, South Africa, ii + 264 pp. page(s): 32
 George M. Branch,C. l. Griffiths,M. L. Branch,L. E. Beckley, Two Oceans: A Guide to the Marine Life of Southern Africa
 Reid, D.G. & Williams, S.T. (2004) The subfamily Littorininae (Gastropoda: Littorinidae) in the temperate Southern Hemisphere: the genera Nodilittorina, Austrolittorina and Afrolittorina. Records of the Australian Museum 56: 75122

External links 
 
 Animal Base : Afrolittorina knysnaensis
 Ispot.org: Afrolittorina knysnaensis
 Worldwide Molluscan Species Data Base: Afrolittorina knysnaensis

knysnaensis
Gastropods described in 1847